Qarah Qeshlaq (also Romanized as Qarah Qeshlāq and Qareh Qeshlāq) is a Kurdish village in Mokriyan-e Gharbi Rural District, in the Central District of Mahabad County, West Azerbaijan Province, Iran. At the 2006 census, its population was 1,455, in 255 families.

References 

Populated places in Mahabad County